The 2011 Tokyo gubernatorial election was held on April 10, 2011 as part of the 17th unified local elections.  There were eleven candidates.

The election occurred in the wake of the 2011 Tohoku earthquake and tsunami and Fukushima nuclear disaster, which occurred on the first day of the campaign. Incumbent governor Shintaro Ishihara entered the race after initially indicating that he would retire, with a platform of supporting the tsunami disaster areas and bidding for the 2020 Summer Olympics. Kanagawa governor Shigefumi Matsuzawa, who had been a prominent candidate at the start of the campaign, left the race on March 15 and threw his support behind Ishihara, arguing that both men needed to stay with their governments through the wake of the disasters. Ishihara remained in the lead in polls through voting day, despite a prominent gaffe in which he characterized the disasters as "divine punishment" for "egoism" in Japanese society. His victory was owed in large part to his crisis management presence following the disasters, such as drinking Tokyo tap water on camera in order to demonstrate that it was safe from radiation.

References

External links 

2011 elections in Japan
Shintaro Ishihara
2011
April 2011 events in Japan
2011 in Tokyo